Sinara Group is a Russian investment company founded in 2001 with holdings in the property development, rail transportation and financial services sectors.

History
The company was founded in 2001, and in 2004 acquired industrial and agricultural companies. In 2006 the group merged with Металлпром. The company division ОАО Синара – Транспортные Машины (Open joint stock company 'Sinara - transport machines') was formed in 2007, and the division Синара – Девелопмент (Sinara - development) was formed in 2009.

In 2009 Sinara Group and Siemens created a joint venture for the production of twin unit electric locomotive to be based at Sinara's Ural Locomotive works near Ekaterinburg. In December 2021, the JV announced production of concept of "Lastochka" electric train with 200 mm low float in 2025.

Group divisions and subsidiaries

Transport engineering and production

The group division ОАО "Синара – Транспортные машины" (Open joint stock company 'Sinara - transport machines') (STM) is based in Ekaterinburg and comprises ОАО "Уральский завод железнодорожного" (JSC Ural locomotive factory) in Verkhnyaya Pyshma, the ОАО "Людиновский тепловозостроительный завод" (Lyudinovsky locomotive factory) in Lyudinovo, the ООО "Уральский дизель-моторный завод" (Ural diesel engine factory Ltd.)  and the ООО "Центр инновационного развития СТМ" (STM research centre) in Ekaterinburg.

Property development
The group division "Синара – Девелопмент" (Sinara - development) includes ООО "фирма КОМ-БИЛДИНГ" (COM-Building company) based in Volgograd, КОТ Новокольцовский (Novokoltsovsky development); a 600ha residential, commercial and industrial development near Ekaterinburg, the ОАО "Архыз-Синара" in Karachay–Cherkessia, the ОАО "Центральный стадион" (Central Stadium company) in Ekaterinburg; a sports arena development, and ЗАО "Интурист-Синара" (Intourist-Sinara); a joint venture with Intourist headquartered in Moscow.

Financial services
The financial services division includes the ООО "СИНАРА-ИНВЕСТ" (Sinara invest) and ОАО "СКБ-банк" (SKB-Bank), both in Ekaterinburg.

In September 2021, Sinara Financial Corporation (an integral part of Sinara Group) bought Think Wealth Ltd, an investment company registered in Cyprus, already renamed in Sinara Financial Corporation (Europe), which is focused on consulting, broker services, trust management, high-frequency trading and others.

Other business areas
The group has holdings in the agricultural business area via ОАО "Каменское", hotels and tourism via ОАО "Пансионат отдыха Бургас" based in Sochi, and energy business via ЗАО "Синэрго" in Ekaterinburg.

In December 2021, Gazprombank confirmed selling of 99,9% of "Kriogaz" LLC, business operator of technical gases, to "Sinara Group" in the first quarter of 2022 within ESG strategy of the buyer. The deal was closed in February 2022.

See also
Transmashholding, Russian railway industry group

References

External links
 Company annual reports

 
Investment companies of Russia
Companies based in Yekaterinburg
Russian brands